Heng is a small island in the Strand municipality of Rogaland, Norway. Heng lies roughly halfway between the islands of Hidle and Idse.

See also
List of islands of Norway

References

Islands of Rogaland
Strand, Norway